In Person! is a 1959 album by Tony Bennett, accompanied by the Count Basie Orchestra.

The album was originally intended to be a live recording of a November 1958 performance at Philadelphia's Latin Casino, but the mono recording of the concert was disregarded by producer Al Ham who wanted the album recorded in stereo. Bennett and Basie were then reunited in the studio a month later to recreate the live concert. Fake applause was dubbed onto the original release of In Person! by Ham, and placed in incorrect places on the album. The effect was poorly received and removed for the album's 1994 re-issue. In his autobiography, The Good Life, Bennett wrote that "I never understood why we didn't release the live version. The whole attempt at fabricating an audience was in bad taste" and that as a result of the experience he had always preferred the second album he recorded with Basie that year, Strike Up the Band.

Basie and Bennett recorded two albums together in 1959; In Person! was released by Bennett's record label, Columbia, and Strike Up the Band was released by Basie's label, Roulette.

Reception

Billboard magazine chose In Person! as one of their "Spotlight Winners of the Week" in March 1959, and wrote that "The drive of the Bennett vocals is excellently paced by the swingin' Basie crew. Tues are nicely paced and varied. It's an exciting set that builds track after track".

Bruce Eder positively reviewed the 1994 re-issue of In Person! for Allmusic, and wrote that "Bennett's sensitively nuanced intonation in the opening of "Pennies from Heaven" is now up close and personal, while the band's beat in the second half of the song is now crisper and more solid than ever. Ralph Sharon, Bennett's usual accompanist, is handling the piano chores (while Basie himself is credited as leader), and his finely articulated playing is also brought out crisply on "Lost in the Stars" and other tracks. It's all worth hearing, and more often than just once—it was records like this, as reconstituted properly for CD, that constituted the absolute golden end of the pop legacy of the late '50s."

Track listing
"Just in Time" (Betty Comden, Adolph Green, Jule Styne) - 1:45
"When I Fall in Love" (Edward Heyman, Victor Young) - 2:20
"Taking a Chance on Love" (Vernon Duke, Ted Fetter, John La Touche) - 1:57
"Without a Song" (Edward Eliscu, Billy Rose, Vincent Youmans) - 3:06
"Fascinating Rhythm" (Gershwin, Ira Gershwin) - 1:30
"(In My) Solitude" (Eddie DeLange, Duke Ellington, Irving Mills) - 3:35
"Pennies from Heaven" (Johnny Burke, Arthur Johnston) - 2:33
"Lost in the Stars" (Maxwell Anderson, Kurt Weill) - 4:01
"Firefly" (Cy Coleman, Carolyn Leigh) - 1:39
"There Will Never Be Another You" (Mack Gordon, Harry Warren) - 3:16
"Lullaby of Broadway" (Al Dubin, Warren) - 3:13
"Ol' Man River" (Oscar Hammerstein II, Jerome Kern) - 5:00

Personnel
 Tony Bennett - vocals
The Count Basie Orchestra:
 Thad Jones, Joe Newman, Snooky Young, Wendell Culley - trumpet
 Henry Coker, Benny Powell, Al Grey - trombone
 Marshal Royal - alto sax, clarinet
 Frank Wess - alto and tenor saxes, flute
 Frank Foster - tenor sax, flute
 Billy Mitchell - tenor sax, clarinet
 Charlie Fowlkes - baritone sax, flute, bass clarinet
 Freddie Green - electric guitar
 Ralph Sharon - piano, arranger
 Eddie Jones - double bass
 Candido Camero - bongos
 Sonny Payne - drums

Other credits
 Al Ham - producer
 Didier C. Deutsch - associate producer
 Al Ham - associate producer
 Frank Laico - engineer
 Cliff Morris - engineer
 Seymour Mednick - photography
 Kevin Boutote - mastering
 Bob Burns - contractor

References

1959 albums
Tony Bennett albums
Count Basie Orchestra albums
Albums produced by Al Ham
Columbia Records albums